WMSZ-LP (95.9 FM, "Easy 95.9 Community Radio") is a low-power radio station broadcasting an easy listening music format. Licensed to Hartsville, South Carolina, United States, the station is currently owned by Lighthouse Gospel Network and features programming from USA Radio Network.

References

External links
 
 

MSZ-LP
MSZ-LP
Easy listening radio stations
Darlington County, South Carolina
Community radio stations in the United States
Radio stations established in 2004
2004 establishments in South Carolina